Freak for Life 6996 (known to some as simply Freak For Life) is the fourth album released by Luther Campbell. It was released on July 12, 1994 through Luke Records and was produced by Darren "DJ Spin" Rudnick, Mike "Fresh" McCray, DJ Slice and Lazaro Mendez. Freak for Life peaked at #174 on the Billboard 200 and #24 on the Top R&B/Hip-Hop Albums, making it his lowest charting album at the time. One single found mild success, "It's Your Birthday" peaked at #33 on the Hot Rap Singles and #91 on the Hot R&B/Hip-Hop Singles & Tracks.

Freak For Life 6996 is the last Luke solo album to be released under Luke Records independently before it went into bankruptcy.  This album is now the property of Lil' Joe Records, who owns the pre-1996 Luke Records catalog.

Track listing
"Freak for Life" – 2:27  
"It's Your Birthday" – 3:49  Produced by: Darren "DJ Spin" Rudnick
"Beat Your Lover" – 1:39  
"That's How I Feel" – 3:26  *feat. JT Money
"Come On" – 3:34  Produced by: Darren "DJ Spin" Rudnick
"Clip on Clicks" – 1:18  
"Megamix" – 5:19  
"Where's the Tittie" – 1:11  
"Some Ol Bullshit" – 4:24  
"You Have Been Bad" – 1:17  
"Pre-Masterbatorial" – 4:37  
"Anal Sex" – 1:39  
"Where Them Ho's At" – 3:07  
"Represent" – 4:14  *feat. The New 2 Live Crew, JT Money & Drugz
"We Are the Weave" – 1:10  
"All My Ex's" – 3:22  
"Out of Control" – 1:50  
"Freaky Business" – 3:17  
"Got to Get Some Work Done" – 0:38  
"Welcome to the Quiet Storm" – 4:45  
"Cool (Some Cool Shit)" – 3:48  
"JC's Detailed Car Wash" – 1:24  
"Movin' Along" – 5:05 *feat. JT Money, Debonaire & Likkle Wicked
"Beat Your Lover" (Reprise) – 9:33

1994 albums
Luther Campbell albums
Luke Records albums